Rostyslav Pevtsov (born 15 April 1987) is a Ukrainian-born Azerbaijani triathlete. He competed in the men's event at the 2016 Summer Olympics held in Rio de Janeiro, Brazil. Pevtsov won the 2017 Hong Kong ASTC Sprint Triathlon Asian Cup. In 2021, he competed in the men's triathlon at the 2020 Summer Olympics held in Tokyo, Japan.

References

External links
 

1987 births
Living people
Azerbaijani male triathletes
Olympic triathletes of Azerbaijan
Triathletes at the 2016 Summer Olympics
Triathletes at the 2020 Summer Olympics
Place of birth missing (living people)
Naturalized citizens of Azerbaijan
Triathletes at the 2015 European Games
European Games medalists in triathlon
European Games bronze medalists for Azerbaijan